The 1990 Ohio gubernatorial election was held on November 6, 1990. Incumbent Democratic Governor Dick Celeste was unable to run for a third consecutive term due to term limits. Former Mayor of Cleveland George Voinovich, who also ran for the United States Senate in 1988, was uncontested for the Republican nomination, while Ohio Attorney General Anthony J. Celebrezze Jr. emerged from the Democratic primary. In the end, Voinovich was able to defeat Celebrezze by a fairly wide margin, winning his first term in office.

Abortion was a key issue of the election. Celebrezze switched from his lifelong anti-abortion position to a pro-choice position nine days before declaring his candidacy. Assuming that this would help him in a mostly pro-choice state, he raised the issue frequently. Because of this, the topic of abortion made the news. This allowed Voinovich to have an issue to criticize Celebrezze's integrity, contributing to Voinovich's win.

Democratic primary

Candidates
 Anthony J. Celebrezze Jr., Attorney General of Ohio
 Michael Hugh Lord, businessman

Results

Republican primary

Candidates
 George Voinovich, former mayor of Cleveland, former lieutenant governor and nominee for the U.S. Senate in 1988

Results

General election

Results

References

Gubernatorial
1990
Ohio